The men's 1500 metres at the 2018 IAAF World U20 Championships was held at Ratina Stadium on 10 and 12 July.

Records

Results

Heats
Qualification: First 3 of each heat (Q) and the 3 fastest times (q) qualified for the final.

Final

References

1500 metres
1500 metres at the World Athletics U20 Championships